Colette Capdevielle (born 14 October 1958) is a French Socialist politician who represented Pyrénées-Atlantiques's 5th constituency in the National Assembly of France in the 14th legislature of the French Fifth Republic, between 2012 and 2017.

Political career 
Capdevielle was elected in the general election in 2012, and was defeated for re-election in 2017 by Florence Lasserre-David of the Democratic Movement.

References 

Living people
1958 births
21st-century French politicians
21st-century French women politicians
Deputies of the 14th National Assembly of the French Fifth Republic
Socialist Party (France) politicians
Women members of the National Assembly (France)
People from Orthez
Politicians from Nouvelle-Aquitaine